Pupa Rebbe may refer to one of the following two Pupa Rebbes:

 Rabbi Yosef Greenwald - previous Rebbe of the Pupa Hasidic dynasty
 Rabbi Yaakov Yechezkia Greenwald II - present Pupa Rebbe